Dybsø is an uninhabited Danish island, with an area of 1.34 km2, located off the southwest coast of Zealand  of in the Baltic Sea. The island, which since 1976 is owned by the state is part of the Dybsø Fjord wildlife reserve.

References 

Danish islands in the Baltic
Islands of Denmark
Geography of Næstved Municipality